Andries Benedetti (c. 1615 – c. 1669) was a Flemish still life painter mainly active in Antwerp who is known for his fruit still lifes and pronkstillevens.

Life
Little is known about the life of Andries Benedetti.  The statement by an art historian that he was born in Parma in Italy is not corroborated by evidence.  The first firm record on the artist dates from 1636 when he was registered at the Antwerp Guild of Saint Luke as an apprentice of Vincent Cernevael.  He is believed to have trained also with Jan Davidszoon de Heem, a prominent Dutch still life painter who was active in Antwerp from the mid-1630s.  He is recorded in de Heem's workshop in 1638.

He was registered as a master in the Antwerp Guild of Saint Luke in the guild year 1640-1641.  The last record on the artist dates from 1649 when Jan Baptist Lust was registered in the Antwerp guild books as his apprentice.  While a stay in Italy has been mentioned by an art historian there is no evidence for this.  The still life painter Andries de Coninck whose work shows similarities with Benedetti's work was likely married to his sister Catherine. 

He seemed to have enjoyed important patronage as one of his works representing a still life with oysters, lobster and fruits was recorded in 1659 in the collection of Archduke Leopold Wilhelm, the art loving Governor General of the Habsburg Netherlands.  Three of his works, now in the collection of the Prado Museum, were originally in the collection of Elisabeth Farnese, the Queen of Spain by marriage to King Philip V, from where they passed to the royal collection of the Royal Palace of Aranjuez.

It is not known when or where he died.

Work

Andries Benedetti was a still life specialist who is known for his fruit still lifes and pronkstillevens, the sumptuous still lifes that were popular in Flanders and the Dutch Republic from the 1640s.

His work was indebted to de Heem's works in the disposition of objects although in Benedetti's work there is a greater profusion of objects.  Benedetti followed the innovations of de Heem, by creating sumptuous compositions, which combine the colourful Flemish palette with the more muted tones popular in Dutch painting.  Beneditti applied the paint less thickly than de Heem.

Because of the close similarities in their output his paintings have been confused for a long time with those of de Heem.  Only after on several still lifes in the collection of the Kunsthistorisches Museum (Vienna) the anagram " A b fe" was identified was it possible to attribute the works to Benedetti.

His works influenced the work of the Italian Pier Francesco Cittadini and his presumed brother-in-law Andries de Coninck.

References

External links

1615 births
1669 deaths
Flemish Baroque painters
Flemish still life painters
Painters from Antwerp